Waimakariri District is a local government district, located in the Canterbury Region of New Zealand's South Island. It is named after the Waimakariri River, which forms the district's southern boundary, separating it from Christchurch City and the Selwyn District. It is bounded in the north by the Hurunui District and in the east by the Pacific Ocean.

The district was established on 1 April 1989 following the merger of Rangiora District and Eyre County. Rangiora is the district seat and largest town, with other major towns including Kaiapoi, Oxford, Pegasus and Woodend.

The current district mayor is Dan Gordon, who was elected in the 2019 local body elections.

Geography
The Waimakariri District lies to the north of the Waimakariri River in North Canterbury. The major urban areas are Rangiora and Kaiapoi, which are respectively about 30 and 20 minutes travelling time by car from the centre of Christchurch City.

There are other urban settlements including Woodend and Oxford, as well as a number of village and beach settlements.

The District occupies some 225,000 hectares, and extends from Pegasus Bay in the east to the Puketeraki Range in the west. It is bounded to the north by the Hurunui District.

Urban areas and settlements
The Waimakariri district has five towns with a population over 1,000. Together they are home to % of the district's population.

Other settlements and localities in the district include:

  Kaiapoi-Woodend Ward:
  Kaiapoi-Tuahiwi Sub-Division:
 Clarkville
 Kaiapoi
 Kairaki
 Ohapuku
 The Pines Beach
 Flaxton
 Tuahiwi
  Woodend-Sefton Sub-Division:
 Coldstream
 Pegasus
 Saltwater Creek
 Sefton
 Waikuku
 Waikuku Beach
 Woodend
 Woodend Beach

  Oxford-Ohoka Ward:
  Ohoka-Swannanoa Sub-Division:
 Eyreton
 Eyrewell
 Mandeville North
 Ohoka
 Swannanoa
 West Eyreton
 Wetheral
 Wilsons Siding
 Oxford Sub-Division:
 Ashley Forest
 Ashley Gorge
 Bennetts
 Bexley
 Burnt Hill
 Carleton
 Coopers Creek
 Gammans Creek
 Glenburn
 Glentui
 Horrellville
 Lees Valley
 Oxford
 Okuku Range
 Rockford
 Starvation Hill
 The Warren
 View Hill
 Okuku Hills

  Rangiora-Ashley Ward:
  Ashley Sub-Division:
 Ashley
 Loburn
 Loburn North
 Okuku
 Whiterock
 Cust
 Fernside
 Springbank
 Summerhill
 Rangiora Sub-Division:
 Rangiora
 Southbrook

History
In pre-European times there were several important Ngāi Tahu settlements in the area now occupied by the Waimakariri District. The centre of Ngāi Tahu was the pa of Taurakautahi, known as Kaiapoi. Today, the hapu Ngai Tuahuriri is based at Tuahiwi, to the north of Kaiapoi. People who identify themselves as having NZ Maori ancestry presently represent 8.5% of the District's population, and most of these people live in the eastern part of the District.

During the early years of European settlement, Kaiapoi developed as a river port. Rangiora was the area's main market town, and the development of Oxford was based on timber milling. The roles of the District's main urban areas have changed during recent years, mainly as the result of the rapid population growth.

During the colonial era the area was also known as Courtenay, but the Maori name Waimakariri ultimately prevailed. The township of Courtenay is today part of the Selwyn District. The name Waimakariri translates from Te Reo Māori to 'cold water', referring to the snow melt source of the river in the Southern Alps.

European settlement concentrated on the fertile soils of the plains. Until the middle of the 20th century extensive agricultural and pastoral farming predominated. More recently, horticultural and forestry have gained in importance. Today some 11% of the District's labour force is now involved with agriculture, forestry and fishing.

Demography

The district has experienced a rapidly growing population that is predicted to continue to increase. Despite rapid growth, Waimakariri has retained its rural/small town character and a high proportion of residents are involved in an extensive range of community and recreational organisations.

Waimakariri District had a population of 59,502 at the 2018 New Zealand census, an increase of 9,513 people (19.0%) since the 2013 census, and an increase of 16,668 people (38.9%) since the 2006 census. There were 22,026 households. There were 29,247 males and 30,258 females, giving a sex ratio of 0.97 males per female. The median age was 43.6 years (compared with 37.4 years nationally), with 11,412 people (19.2%) aged under 15 years, 9,675 (16.3%) aged 15 to 29, 27,174 (45.7%) aged 30 to 64, and 11,241 (18.9%) aged 65 or older.

Ethnicities were 92.9% European/Pākehā, 8.6% Māori, 1.4% Pacific peoples, 2.9% Asian, and 1.8% other ethnicities. People may identify with more than one ethnicity.

The percentage of people born overseas was 17.6, compared with 27.1% nationally.

Although some people objected to giving their religion, 53.9% had no religion, 36.0% were Christian, 0.3% were Hindu, 0.2% were Muslim, 0.2% were Buddhist and 1.9% had other religions.

Of those at least 15 years old, 7,080 (14.7%) people had a bachelor or higher degree, and 10,050 (20.9%) people had no formal qualifications. The median income was $33,600, compared with $31,800 nationally. 8,667 people (18.0%) earned over $70,000 compared to 17.2% nationally. The employment status of those at least 15 was that 23,925 (49.8%) people were employed full-time, 7,806 (16.2%) were part-time, and 1,305 (2.7%) were unemployed.

Economy
A large portion of the Waimakariri District has fertile flat land, or highly productive rolling downs. Much of the land to the east of Rangiora is reclaimed swamp, which is still subject to poor drainage and occasional flooding.

The north-western portion of the District is hill and high country. These hills, including Mt Oxford, Mt Richardson, Mt Thomas and Mt Grey, dominate the District's western landscape.

Historically the District was dominated by extensive agricultural and pastoral farming activity with few major industries. More recently many new small holdings have been created; some of these are used for full-time or part-time horticultural enterprises, including vegetable and flower growing.

The District has a few major industries. A large fibreboard plant at Sefton draws on local wood resources. The other industries are mainly small-scale service and processing enterprises, some of which also use local wood resources.

The Waimakariri District has a high standard of communications. The South Island Main Trunk Railway and State Highway 1 cross the eastern portion of the District. The District also has an airfield at Rangiora, and is close to the Christchurch International Airport. Telecommunications are continually being upgraded.

Recreation
The District offers a wide range of recreation. It has sandy beaches, estuaries, river gorges and braided rivers, which offer a range of choices for fishing, boating and rafting.

The famous Waimakariri River provides opportunities to jet boat, kayak and fish, and sandy beaches are nearby. The District also offers the opportunity to enjoy sailing on Pegasus Lake, horse riding, farm tours and weekly farmers' markets.

The foothills and mountains offer a variety of tramping experiences which complement a growing range of walking trails and formal recreational areas throughout the District.

Education

The Waimakariri District is served by 20 state and three state-integrated primary schools, as well as two area schools covering years 1–13, one in Oxford and one in Rangiora (Rangiora New Life), and two secondary schools: Rangiora High School and Kaiapoi High School. Many of the primary schools are well supported by the community, and an increasing number of pre-schools have begun to open in the District.

References

External links

 Waimakariri District Council
 Waimakariri Tourist Information
 Waimakariri Business and Corporate Information